K. Jennitha Anto (born 10 April 1987) is an chess Woman International Master from Tiruchchirappalli, Tamil Nadu, India. Having caught polio at the age three, she uses a wheelchair. She took to chess at the age of 9. She is a six-time champion of the World Chess Championship for the Physically Disabled conducted by IPCA and five times consecutively from 2013 to 2017. She is a woman International Master (WIM) title holder and aims at becoming a Grand Master.

In the 2018 Asian Para-games, she won four medals - one gold, two silvers and one bronze. In the 19th IPCA World Individual Chess Championship 2019, she secured 5.0/9 points to become the highest scoring female player in the event and clinched the title for a record sixth time.

Tiruchirappalli Corporation has appointed K. Jennitha Anto as its brand ambassador for Swachh Bharat Mission activities from 2017.

References

1987 births
Living people
Indian female chess players
Chess Woman International Masters